Brian Patrick Sikorski (born July 27, 1974) is an American former professional baseball pitcher.

He played professional baseball in Japan for five years, until  for the Yomiuri Giants.

Sikorski played college baseball at Western Michigan University for the Broncos. He was named the Mid-American Conference Baseball Pitcher of the Year in 1995, an award he shared with Mike Nartker of Kent State. Sikorski was drafted in the fourth round of the  amateur entry draft by the Houston Astros.

The Cleveland Indians acquired Sikorski in a trade July 18, 2006, by sending right-handed pitcher Mike Adams to the San Diego Padres. On May 17, Sikorski's contract was sold to the Tokyo Yakult Swallows. After two more seasons with the Marines, Sikorski signed a contract with the Saitama Seibu Lions to be the team's closer in 2010. Securing the closer spot for the first time in his Japanese career, Sikorski responded, as of August 29, 2010, he leads the Pacific League in saves with 30, and he did not blow a save until August 20 against the Hokkaido Nippon-Ham Fighters. Until the 2010 season, Sikorski's record for saves was 15; this was broken on May 25 against the Hiroshima Toyo Carp.

Like many pitchers, Sikorski is known for his strict adherence to his pre-pitching routine.  Two of his most noticeable routines are how he vigorously swings his right (pitching) arm in a windmill-style circle, both forwards and backwards before throwing his warmup pitches.  Also, after getting the third out of the inning, he sprints off the mound and jumps over the foul line on the way to his team's dugout, resulting in him usually being the first one in.

In , Sikorski was listed as a member of the Texas Rangers' professional scouting staff, based in Fraser, Michigan. After the  season, he left the Rangers organization to become a scout for the Miami Marlins.

In 2018, his son, Easton, signed a national letter of intent to play baseball at Western Michigan.

References

External links

1974 births
Living people
American people of Slovak descent
American people of Polish descent
Major League Baseball pitchers
Baseball players from Michigan
Cleveland Indians players
Miami Marlins scouts
Texas Rangers players
Texas Rangers scouts
San Diego Padres players
American expatriate baseball players in Japan
Nippon Professional Baseball pitchers
Chiba Lotte Marines players
Yomiuri Giants players
Tokyo Yakult Swallows players
Saitama Seibu Lions players
Western Michigan Broncos baseball players
Western Michigan University alumni
Auburn Astros players
New Orleans Zephyrs players
Oklahoma RedHawks players
Portland Beavers players
Buffalo Bisons (minor league) players
People from Fraser, Michigan
Sportspeople from Metro Detroit
Jackson Generals (Texas League) players
Kissimmee Cobras players
Quad Cities River Bandits players